Duval County may refer to:

 Duval County, Florida 
 Duval County, Texas